Ernest Myers, also known as Colin Myers, was an English professional footballer who played as an inside left.

Career
Born in Chapeltown, Sheffield, Myers spent his early career with Northfleet, Crystal Palace and Hickleton Main Colliery. He joined Bradford City in April 1914, and made 1 league appearance for the club, scoring 1 goal. He left the club in May 1920 to join Southend United, where he scored 2 goals in 23 league games. He later played for Aberdare Athletic, Northampton Town, Queens Park Rangers, Exeter City, Grantham, Hartlepools United, Gainsborough Trinity and King's Lynn.

Sources

References

Year of birth missing
Year of death missing
English footballers
Northfleet United F.C. players
Crystal Palace F.C. players
Bradford City A.F.C. players
Southend United F.C. players
Aberdare Athletic F.C. players
Northampton Town F.C. players
Queens Park Rangers F.C. players
Exeter City F.C. players
Grantham Town F.C. players
Hartlepool United F.C. players
Gainsborough Trinity F.C. players
King's Lynn F.C. players
English Football League players
Association football inside forwards